Brinegar Cabin is a historic home located near Whitehead, Alleghany County, North Carolina. It was built about 1880, and is a one-story log house covered with lapped siding and resting on an uncoursed fieldstone foundation. Also on the property is a contributing frame outbuilding. The property is part of the lands comprising the Blue Ridge Parkway, and the cabin houses a display of mountain crafts and weaving.

It was listed on the National Register of Historic Places in 1972.

References

External links 

North Carolina Mountain Dreams

Log cabins in the United States
Houses on the National Register of Historic Places in North Carolina
Houses completed in 1880
Houses in Alleghany County, North Carolina
National Register of Historic Places in Alleghany County, North Carolina
Tourist attractions in Alleghany County, North Carolina
Log buildings and structures on the National Register of Historic Places in North Carolina